Fort Scott High School is a public high school in Fort Scott, Kansas, United States at 1005 South Main Street.  It is operated by Fort Scott USD 234 public school district.  The school mascot is a tiger and the school colors are red and white.

Notable alumni
 Adam LaRoche (1998), baseball player
 Mark Hart (1971), multi-instrumentalist musician and member of the bands Crowded House, Supertramp, and Ringo Starr.

See also
 List of high schools in Kansas
 List of unified school districts in Kansas

References

Public high schools in Kansas
Education in Bourbon County, Kansas